is a coeducational private university in Minami-ku, Nagoya, Aichi Prefecture, Japan.

History

The university began as the Daido Technical-Educational Foundation in 1939. In 1969, the school became the Daido Institute of Technology. The university traces its origin back to the companies founded by Momosuke Fukuzawa. These companies consist of the Great Consolidated Electric Power Company, Limited (current: Kansai Electric Power Company and Chubu Electric Power Co., Inc.), the Nisshinbo Industries, Toho Gas Co., Ltd., Daido Steel Co., Ltd., Toagosei and Nagoya Railroad Co., Ltd. (Meitetsu), etc. He had a concept of a research institute for industrial technician trainings. The president of Daido Steel, Yoshio Shimoide (a member of the Japanese Diet), was inspired by his concept. In January 1939, Daido Technical-Educational Foundation was established by Yoshio Simoide.

The school was close to Daidōchō Station. Responding to strong demand in Nagoya's industrial companies (such as Daido Steel, Chubu Electric Power and Nagoya Railroad), the Daido Institute of Technology was established in 1962.

President
Akira Sawaoka, senior counselor of JAXA

Faculty of Engineering
Department of Mechanical Engineering
Department of Integrated Mechanical Engineering Mechanical System Engineering Course
Department of Integrated Mechanical Engineering Robotics Course
Department of Electrical and Electronic Engineering
Department of Architecture Architecture Course
Department of Architecture Interior Design Course
Department of Architecture Civil Engineering and Environmental Design Course

Faculty of Informatics
Department of Information Systems Computer Science Course
Department of Information Systems Information Network Course
Department of Information Design Media Design Course
Department of Information Design Product Design Course
Department of Integrated Informatics Odor and Aroma Design Course
Department of Integrated Informatics　Management and Business Information Course

International exchange
University of Oregon
Oregon State University
Politecnico di Milano
Chinese Academy of Sciences
University of Copenhagen
University of Nottingham
RWTH Aachen University
Dong-a University
Thai-Nichi Institute of Technology

External links
 Official website 
 Official website 

Educational institutions established in 1939
Private universities and colleges in Japan
Universities and colleges in Nagoya
1939 establishments in Japan